Thomas Parsonage (13 November 1910 – 3 February 1951) was an Australian cricketer. He played one first-class match for New South Wales in 1932/33.

See also
 List of New South Wales representative cricketers

References

External links
 

1910 births
1951 deaths
Australian cricketers
New South Wales cricketers
Cricketers from Sydney